The Silver Lining: The Songs of Jerome Kern is a studio album by Tony Bennett and Bill Charlap, released by RPM/Columbia on September 25, 2015. The album includes covers of 14 songs composed by Jerome Kern, featuring Bill Charlap on piano, Peter Washington on bass, Kenny Washington on drums, and special guest, pianist Renee Rosnes on four two-piano tracks.

Reception 

The album topped the Jazz Albums chart, while debuted at 89 on the Billboard 200 albums chart. It won the Best Traditional Pop Vocal Album at the 58th Annual Grammy Awards.

Track listing 
All music composed by Jerome Kern; lyricists are credited below.
 "All the Things You Are" (Oscar Hammerstein II) – 4:37
 "Pick Yourself Up" (Dorothy Fields) – 2:55
 "The Last Time I Saw Paris" (Hammerstein) – 3:24
 "I Won't Dance" (Fields, Hammerstein, Otto Harbach, Jimmy McHugh) – 3:12
 "Long Ago and Far Away" (Ira Gershwin) – 3:23
 "Dearly Beloved" (Johnny Mercer) – 3:29
 "The Song Is You" (Hammerstein) – 3:55
 "They Didn't Believe Me" (Herbert Reynolds) – 4:49
 "I'm Old Fashioned" (Mercer) – 2:45
 "The Way You Look Tonight" (Fields) – 2:54
 "Yesterdays" (Harbach) – 3:30
 "Make Believe" (Hammerstein) – 2:18
 "Nobody Else but Me" (Hammerstein) – 2:40
 "Look for the Silver Lining" (B. G. DeSylva) – 2:36

Source: The New York Times

Personnel  
 Tony Bennett – vocals (1–14)
 Bill Charlap – piano (1–14) 
 Peter Washington – double bass (2, 4, 6, 8, 9, 11, 13)
 Kenny Washington – drums (2, 4, 6, 8, 9, 11, 13)
 Renee Rosnes – special guest on piano (3, 5, 7, 14)

Charts

References 

 Personnel: https://www.discogs.com/fr/release/7818493-Tony-Bennett-Bill-Charlap-The-Silver-Lining-The-Songs-Of-Jerome-Kern

2015 albums
Columbia Records albums
Grammy Award for Best Traditional Pop Vocal Album
Jerome Kern tribute albums
Tony Bennett albums